Computer-supported collaboration research focuses on technology that affects groups, organizations, communities and societies, e.g., voice mail and text chat. It grew from cooperative work study of supporting people's work activities and working relationships. As net technology increasingly supported a wide range of recreational and social activities, consumer markets expanded the user base, enabling more and more people to connect online to create what researchers have called a computer supported cooperative work, which includes "all contexts in which technology is used to mediate human activities such as communication, coordination, cooperation, competition, entertainment, games, art, and music" (from CSCW 2004).

Scope of the field

Focused on output
The subfield computer-mediated communication deals specifically with how humans use "computers" (or digital media) to form, support and maintain relationships with others (social uses), regulate information flow (instructional uses), and make decisions (including major financial and political ones). It does not focus on common work products or other "collaboration" but rather on "meeting" itself, and on trust. By contrast, CSC is focused on the output from, rather than the character or emotional consequences of, meetings or relationships, reflecting the difference between "communication" and "collaboration".

Focused on contracts and rendezvous
Unlike communication research, which focuses on trust, or computer science, which focuses on truth and logic, CSC focuses on cooperation and collaboration and decision making theory, which are more concerned with rendezvous and contract. For instance, auctions and market systems, which rely on bid and ask relationships, are studied as part of CSC but not usually as part of communication.

The term CSC emerged in the 1990s to replace the following terms:
 workgroup computing, which emphasizes technology over the work being supported and seems to restrict inquiry to small organizational units.
 groupware, which became a commercial buzzword and was used to describe popular commercial products such as Lotus Notes. Check here for a comprehensive literature review.
 computer supported cooperative work, which is the name of a conference and which seems only to address research into experimental systems and the nature of workplaces and organizations doing "work", as opposed, say, to play or war.

Collaboration is not a software
Two different types of software are sometimes differentiated:
 social software, which produces social ties as its primary output, e.g., a social network service
 collaborative software, which produces a collaborative deliverable, e.g., an online collaborative encyclopedia like Wikipedia. 

Base technologies such as netnews, email, chat and wikis could be described as "social", "collaborative" or both or neither. Those who say "social" seem to focus on so-called "virtual community" while those who say "collaborative" seem to be more concerned with content management and the actual output. While software may be designed to achieve closer social ties or specific deliverables, it is hard to support collaboration without also enabling relationships to form, and hard to support a social interaction without some kind of shared co-authored works.

May include games
Accordingly, the differentiation between social and collaborative software may also be stated as that between "play" and "work". Some theorists hold that a play ethic should apply, and that work must become more game-like or play-like in order to make using computers a more comfortable experience. The study of MUDs and MMRPGs in the 1980s and 1990s led many to this conclusion, which is now not controversial. 

True multi-player computer games can be considered a simple form of collaboration, but only a few theorists include this as part of CSC.

Not just about "computing" 

The relatively new areas of evolutionary computing, massively parallel algorithms, and even "artificial life" explore the solution of problems by the evolving interaction of large numbers of small actors, or agents, or decision-makers who interact in a largely unconstrained fashion. The "side effect" of the interaction may be a solution of interest, such as a new sorting algorithm; or there may be a permanent residual of the interaction, such as the setting of weights in a neural network that has now been "tuned" or "trained" to repeatedly solve a specific problem, such as making a decision about granting credit to a person, or distinguishing a diseased plant from a healthy one. Connectionism is a study of systems in which the learning is stored in the linkages, or connections, not in what is normally thought of as content.

This expands the definition of "computing", such that it is not just the data, or the metadata, or the context of the data, but the computer itself which is being "processed".

Requires protocols
Communication essential to the collaboration, or disruptive of it, is studied in CSC proper. It is somehow hard to find or draw a line between a well-defined process and general human communications.

Reflecting desired organization protocols and business processes and governance norms directly, so that regulated communication (the collaboration) can be told apart from free-form interactions, is important to collaboration research, if only to know where to stop the study of work and start the study of people. The subfield CMC or computer-mediated communication deals with human relationships.

Basic tasks
Tasks undertaken in this field resemble those of any social science, but with a special focus on systems integration and groups:

Less ambitiously, specific CSC fields are often studied under their own names with no reference to the more general field of study, focusing instead on the technology with only minimal attention to the collaboration implied, e.g. video games, videoconferences. Since some specialized devices exist for games or conferences that do not include all of the usual boot image capabilities of a true "computer", studying these separately may be justified. There is also separate study of e-learning, e-government, e-democracy and telemedicine. The subfield telework also often stands alone.

History

Early research
The development of this field reaches back to the late 1960s and the visionary assertions of Ted Nelson, Douglas Engelbart, Alan Kay, Glenn Gould, Nicholas Negroponte and others who saw a potential for digital media to ultimately redefine how people work. A very early thinker, Vannevar Bush, even suggested in 1945 As We May Think.

Numbers
The inventor of the computer "mouse", Douglas Engelbart, studied collaborative software (especially revision control in computer-aided software engineering and the way a graphic user interface could enable interpersonal communication) in the 1960s. Alan Kay worked on Smalltalk, which embodied these principles, in the 1970s, and by the 1980s it was well regarded and considered to represent the future of user interfaces.

However, at this time, collaboration capabilities were limited. As few computers had even local area networks, and processors were slow and expensive, the idea of using them simply to accelerate and "augment" human communication was eccentric in many situations. Computers processed numbers, not text, and the collaboration was in general devoted only to better and more accurate handling of numbers.

Text
This began to change in the 1980s with the rise of personal computers, modems and more general use of the Internet for non-academic purposes. People were clearly collaborating online with all sorts of motives, but using a small suite of tools (LISTSERV, netnews, IRC, MUD) to support all of those motives. Research at this time focused on textual communication, as there was little or no exchange of audio and video representations. Some researchers, such as Brenda Laurel, emphasized how similar online dialogue was to a play, and applied Aristotle's model of drama to their analysis of computers for collaboration.

Another major focus was hypertext—in its pre-HTML, pre-WWW form, focused more on links and semantic web applications than on graphics. Such systems as Superbook, NoteCards, KMS and the much simpler HyperTies and HyperCard were early examples of collaborative software used for e-learning.

Audio
In the 1990s, the rise of broadband networks and the dotcom boom presented the internet as mass media to a whole generation. By the late 1990s, VoIP and net phones and chat had emerged. For the first time, people used computers primarily as communications, not "computing" devices. This, however, had long been anticipated, predicted, and studied by experts in the field.

Video collaboration is not usually studied. Online videoconferencing and webcams have been studied in small scale use for decades but since people simply do not have built-in facilities to create video together directly, they are properly a communication, not collaboration, concern.

Pioneers
Other pioneers in the field included Ted Nelson, Austin Henderson, Kjeld Schmidt, Lucy Suchman, Sara Bly, Randy Farmer, and many "economists, social psychologists, anthropologists, organizational theorists, educators, and anyone else who can shed light on group activity." - Grudin.

Politics and business
In this century, the focus has shifted to sociology, political science, management science and other business disciplines. This reflects the use of the net in politics and business and even other high-stakes collaboration situations, such as war.

War
Though it is not studied at the ACM conferences, military use of collaborative software has been a very major impetus of work on maps and data fusion, used in military intelligence. A number of conferences and journals are concerned primarily with the military use of digital media and the security implications thereof.

Current research
Current research in computer-supported collaboration includes:

Speech recognition

Early researchers, such as Bill Buxton, had focused on non-voice gestures (like humming or whistling) as a way to communicate with the machine while not interfering too directly with speech directed at a person. Some researchers believed voice as command interfaces were bad for this reason, because they encouraged speaking as if to a "slave".

Link semantics

HTML supports simple link types with the REL tag and REV tag. Some standards for using these on the WWW were proposed, most notably in 1994, by people very familiar with earlier work in SGML. However, no such scheme has ever been adopted by a large number of web users, and the "semantic web" remains unrealized. Attempts such as crit.org have sometimes collapsed totally.

Identity and privacy
Who am I, online? Can an account be assumed to be the same as a person's real-life identity? Should I have rights to continue any relationship I start through a service, even if I'm not using it any longer? Who owns information about the user? What about others (not the user) who are affected by information revealed or learned by me?

Online identity and privacy concerns, especially identity theft, have grown to dominate the CSCW agenda in more recent years. The separate Computers, Freedom and Privacy conferences deal with larger social questions, but basic concerns that apply to systems and work process design tend still to be discussed as part of CSC research.

Online decision making
Where decisions are made based exclusively or mostly on information received or exchanged online, how do people rendezvous to signal their trust in it, and willingness to make major decisions on it?

Team consensus decision making in software engineering, and the role of revision control, revert, reputation and other functions, has always been a major focus of CSC: There is no software without someone writing it. Presumably, those who do write it must understand something about collaboration in their own team. This design and code, however, is only one form of collaborative content.

Collaborative content

What are the most efficient and effective ways to share information? Can creative networks form through online meeting/work systems? Can people have equal power relationships in building content?

By the late 1990s, with the rise of wikis (a simple repository and data dictionary that was easy for the public to use), the way consensus applied to joint editing, meeting agendas and so on had become a major concern. Different wikis adopted different social and pseudopolitical structures to combat the problems caused by conflicting points of view and differing opinions on content.

Workflow
How can work be made simpler, less prone to error, easier to learn? What role do diagrams and notations play in improving work output? What words do workers come to work already understanding, what do they misunderstand, and how can they use the same words to mean the same thing?

Study of content management, enterprise taxonomy and the other core instructional capital of the learning organization has become increasingly important due to ISO standards and the use of continuous improvement methods.
Natural language and application commands tend to converge over time, becoming reflexive user interfaces.

Telework and human capital management
The role of social network analysis and outsourcing services like e-lance, especially when combined in services like LinkedIn, is of particular concern in human capital management—again, especially in the software industry, where it is becoming more and more normal to run 24x7 globally distributed shops.

Computer-supported collaboration on Art 
The romanticized notion of a lone, genius artist has existed since the time of Giorgio Vasari’s Lives of the Artists, published in 1568. Vasari promulgated the idea that artistic skill was endowed upon chosen individuals by gods, which created an enduring and largely false popular misunderstanding of many artistic processes. Artists have used collaboration to complete large scale works for centuries, but the myth of the lone artist was not widely questioned until the 1960s and 1970s.

With the appearance of computers, and especially with the invention of the internet, collaboration on art became easier than before. This crowd-sourced creativity online is putting a "new twist" on traditional ideas of artistic ownership, online communication and art production. In some cases, people don't even know they are making contributions to online art.

Artists in the computer era are considered more "socially aware" in a way that supports social collaboration on social matters. Art duos, such as the Italian Hackatao duo, collaborate both physically and online while creating their art in order to "create a meeting place between the NFT and traditional art worlds."

Crowdsourcing aids with innovation processes, successful implementation and maintenance of ideas generation, thereby providing support for the development of promising innovative ideas. Crowdsourcing has been used in various ways from rousing musical numbers, to choreography, set design, costumes and marketing materials and in some cases was crowdsourced using social media platforms.

Related fields
Related fields are collaborative product development, CAD/CAM, computer-aided software engineering (CASE), concurrent engineering, workflow management, distance learning, telemedicine, medical CSCW and the real-time network conferences called MUDs (after "multi-user dungeons," although they are now used for more than game-playing).

See also
 Citizen science
 Collaborative information seeking
 Collaborative work systems
 Collaborative development environment
 Computer-supported collaborative learning
 Integrated collaboration environment
 List of collaborative software
 List of project management software
 Mass collaboration
 Toolkits for User Innovation
 Wicked problem

References

External links
 SPARC - Space Physics and Aeronomy Research Collaboratory.
 Science Of Collaboratories - Science of Collaboratories Project Home, with links to over 100 specific collaboratories
 Paul Resnick - Professor Paul Resnick's home page ( papers on SocioTechnical Capital, reputation systems, ride share coordination services, recommender systems, collaborative filtering, social filtering). 
 Reticula - Weblogs, Wikis, and Public Health Today. News, professional activities, and academic research.
 US National Health Information Network News about and links into the US NHIN and efforts to build a nationwide virtual electronic health record to support and facilitate electronic collaboration between clinicians, hospitals, patients, social work, and public health.
 Political Blogosphere - The Political Blogosphere and the 2004 U.S. Election: Divided They Blog, Adamic L. and Glance N., HP Labs, 2005. ("In this paper, we study the linking patterns and discussion topics of political bloggers. Our aim is to measure the degree of interaction between liberal and conservative blogs, and to uncover any differences in the structure of the two communities.")
  - CSCW and Groupware Literature Guide: Randy's Reviews, Recommendations, and (Optional) Referrals.

Collaboration
Computing and society
Computer-mediated communication